Lake Kimihia is located approximately 5 km to the Northeast of Huntly, in the Waikato Region of New Zealand. Lake Kimihia is a riverine lake, which links to the Waikato River.

Lake Kimihia was significantly modified as a result of open cast coal mining, around the early 1940s. A cofferdam was built to allow mining over most of the bed, by reducing the lake from its previous . In the 1960s there were two lakes, but the westerly one has been replaced by a wetland.

The lake is situated within predominantly pastoral land. An area at the southern end of the lake is being developed into a wetland, as the Huntly bypass of the Waikato Expressway is built across part of the former lakebed.

References

External links
Waikato River lower lakes, Te Ara: The Encyclopedia of New Zealand

Kimihia
Kimihia
Kimihia
Huntly, New Zealand